Live At The Music Gallery is a live album and concert film which captures the launch show for Flowers Of Hell’s Come Hell Or High Water LP. It was initially released as a DVD package with the group’s 2010 album, “O”.

Critical reception 
Drowned in Sound music critic Dom Gourlay declared it “a startling document of a unique ensemble at its most potently creative, with ne'er a bum note or false start in sight.”

Credits 
 Producer & Director - Greg Jarvis
 Editor - Ian Jarvis
 Camera - Avery Strok and Graeme Phillips
 Audio Recording - Perren Baker
 Audio Mixing & Mastering - Peter J. Moore
 Baritone Saxophone - Regis Pomes
 Cello - Jennifer Moersch
 Double Bass - Hollie Stevenett
 Drums & Tympanis - Ami Spears, Linda Noelle Bush
 Electric Bass - Ronnie Morris
 Flute - Brian Taylor
 Guitar - Greg Jarvis, Jeremiah Knight
 Piano - Greg Jarvis
 Trumpet - Ira Zingraff
 Violin - Laura C. Bates, Tanya Charles

References 

2010 albums
The Flowers of Hell albums